The 1966 Isle of Man TT races were held later in the year than the traditional May/June fortnight due to the seamen's strike which affected access to the Island for all concerned. After the strike ended in July, the TT races were re-organised to fit with the remaining events in the Grand Prix calendar and preceded the September Manx Grand Prix, meaning nearly a month of continuous disruption to everyday Isle of Man affairs and much concerted effort from the motorcycle trade and journalists together with the many volunteers and support workers.

1966 Isle of Man Lightweight TT 125cc final standings
3 Laps (113.19 Miles) Mountain Course.

1966 Sidecar TT final standings
3 Laps (113.19 Miles) Mountain Course.

1966 Isle of Man Lightweight TT 250cc final standings
6 Laps (226.38 Miles) Mountain Course.

1966 Isle of Man Junior TT 350cc final standings
6 Laps (236.38 Miles) Mountain Course.

1966 50cc Ultra-Lightweight TT final standings
3 Laps (113.19 Miles) Mountain Course.

1966 Isle of Man Senior TT 500cc final standings
6 Laps (236.38 Miles) Mountain Course.

References

External links
 Detailed race results
 Mountain Course map

Isle of Man Tt
Tourist Trophy
Isle of Man TT
Isle of Man TT